Return of the Ballin' is the second solo album by rap producer Mannie Fresh. It was released on October 27, 2009.  Two singles were released from the album, "Like a Boss" and "Drought," the latter of which featured Rick Ross and Lil Jon.

Track listing
All tracks produced by Mannie Fresh

References

2009 albums
Mannie Fresh albums
Albums produced by Mannie Fresh